Ouessant (S623) is an  built for the French Navy.

Construction and career 

She was completed at the Arsenal de Cherbourg in 1978 and served the French Navy until her 2001 decommissioning. From 2005 to 2009, Ouessant was employed as a training vessel to train Royal Malaysian Navy personnel who will operate the two French-built s planned for the Royal Malaysian Navy. Despite official statements in 2009 that Ouessant had been sold to Malaysia, the position remained unclear. Because of Ouessants role in the establishment of the Malaysian submarine forces, plans to return the vessel to Malaysia to serve as a museum ship were announced in July 2009.; Ouessant was formally transferred to the Malaysian Government on 23 September 2011 to be transported to Klebang, Malacca to become a submarine museum.

See also
 List of submarines of France

References 

Agosta-class submarines of the French Navy
Ships built in France
1976 ships
Submarines of Malaysia
France–Malaysia relations
Museum ships in Malaysia